Stranded II is a German 3D action-adventure survival video game released in June 2007 by German developer Unreal Software as a sequel to the original Stranded game. Just like in its predecessor, the main goal of the game is to survive on a desert island environment, ultimately escaping and returning home. The game can be downloaded for free on its official website and on the developer's website.

History and development 
Just like the original, Stranded 2 was developed in Blitz3D. Because of the unexpected success of Stranded, Peter Schauß started work on the sequel Stranded II in late 2003. Development entered public alpha stage in December 2005. But still, the release of the final version didn't happen until June 2007. He supplied an additional update in 2008, but then development on Stranded II was abandoned in favor of work on Counter-Strike 2D. After some time, the source code of Stranded II was released under the GNU General Public License, but some days later, Peter Schauß changed the license of the source code to Creative Commons CC-BY-NC-SA.

Gameplay 
In comparison to its precursor, Stranded II features improved graphics and more items, tools and weapons, as well as new features such as taming animals and burning down certain world objects. Also, Stranded II now has a campaign with a story spanning over a travel to several islands. The fundamental gameplay principles remained the same.

In addition, Stranded II has scripting capabilities and therefore allows the creation of scripted maps. This enables map creators to incorporate narratives into their stories by use of character dialogues, quests, scripted events or cut scenes.

One goal of Stranded II was to allow an easy creation of modifications by use of these scripts and editable object definition files. The community-created mods either extend the range of available items ("Extension Mod", "Massive Mod") or take the game scenario to other places ("Lost in Space"). The new items, and the new possibilities to combine these allow the player to discover the game mechanics anew, increasing the replay rate.

Reception 
Stranded 2 was well received by the critics and a success with the public. Games Finder gave the game a 7.5/10 rating, saying "As a free to play survival experience that is both simple and incredibly fun, you can’t look past Stranded 2."

References

External links 
 Official website
 Developer's website

2007 video games
Action-adventure games
Freeware games
Video games set on islands
Windows-only freeware games
Survival video games
Creative Commons-licensed video games
Video games with available source code
Open-source video games
Video games developed in Germany
Windows games
Windows-only games